Reybold may refer to:

Eugene Reybold (1884–1961), United States Army officer
, more than one United States Navy ship